Ismaël Landry Doukouré (born 24 July 2003) is a French professional footballer who plays as a centre-back or a defensive midfielder for Ligue 1 club Strasbourg.

Career
On 2 July 2020, Doukouré signed his first professional contract with Valenciennes for 3 years. He made his professional debut in a 0-0 Ligue 2 draw with Sochaux on 17 October 2020.

On 29 January 2022, Doukouré signed with Strasbourg for 4.5 years.

Personal life
Born in France, Doukouré is of Ivorian descent.

References

External links
 
 FF Proile

2003 births
Living people
Footballers from Lille
French footballers
French sportspeople of Ivorian descent
Association football defenders
Valenciennes FC players
RC Strasbourg Alsace players
Ligue 2 players
Championnat National 3 players
Olympic footballers of France
Footballers at the 2020 Summer Olympics